Chu Sang-mi (born 9 May 1972) is a South Korean actress. She was born in Seoul, South Korea, to the popular stage actor Chu Song-woong. Along with Lee Byung-hun and Choi Ji-woo, Chu co-starred in the film Everybody Has Secrets, taking the role as the eldest sister of the trio.

Filmography

Film 
 2007: The Wonder Years
 2006: See You After School (cameo) 
 2006: Ssunday Seoul (cameo)
 2005: My Right to Ravage Myself
 2004: Everybody Has Secrets
 2004: Twentidentity short - Under a Big Tree
 2003: A Smile
 2002: On the Occasion of Remembering the Turning Gate
 2001: Say Yes
 2000: Interview
 1998: The Soul Guardians
 1997: The Contact
 1996: A Petal

Television drama 
 2022: Tracer (MBC) - Min So-jeong 
 2009: City Hall (SBS)
 2008: My Woman (MBC) 
 2007: Snow in August (SBS) 
 2006: Love and Ambition (SBS) 
 2005: Let's Get Married (MBC) 
 2005: Lawyers (MBC) 
 2003: Yellow Handkerchief (KBS)
 2003: Age of Warriors (KBS)
 1999: Invitation (KBS) 
 1998: Lie (KBS)
 1998: Sunflower  (MBC)
 1997: New York Story (SBS)

Awards and nominations

External links 
 http://chusangmi.rosy.net (Official website)

References 

1973 births
Living people
Actresses from Seoul
South Korean film actresses
South Korean television actresses
Jeonju Chu clan